The Chorrillo Formation, also named as Chorillo Formation, is a Maastrichtian (Late Cretaceous Epoch, 72.1 - 66 million years ago) geologic formation in southern Patagonia, Argentina.

Fossils
Dinosaur remains are among the fossils that have been recovered from the formation.

Fossils recovered from the formation are:

Dinosaurs
  Isasicursor
  Nullotitan
  Maip
  Kookne
  Yatenavis
 Ankylosauria indet.
 Euiguanodontia indet.
 Hadrosauridae indet.
 Megaraptoridae indet.
 Noasauridae indet.
 Unenlagiidae indet.
Anurans
 Anura indet.
 Calyptocephalellidae indet
Fishes
 Teleostei indet.
 Vidalamiinae indet.
Mammals
 Magallanodon
 Mammalia indet.
 Patagorhynchus
Mosasaurs
 Mosasauridae indet.
Snakes
 Rionegrophis
 Serpentes indet.
Turtles
 Chelidae indet.

Other fossils recovered from the formation are:

Gastropods
 Pomacea sp.
Pleuroceridae indet.
 Potamolithus sp.
 Physa sp.
 Stenophysa sp.
Achatinidae indet.
 Holospira sp.
Bulimulidae indet.

Plants

 Podocarpoxylon dusenii

Pollen

 Baculatisporites comaumensis
 Baculatisporites kachaikensis
 Ceratosporites equalis
 Clavifera triplex
 Clavatipollenites sp.
 Concavissimisporites sp.
 Cyatheacidites annulatus
 Cyathidites australis
 Cyathidites minor
 Cyathidites rafaeli
 Foveosporites canalis
 Gleicheniidites senonicus
 Laevigatosporites ovatus
 Leptolepidites sp. cf. L. major
 Microcachryidites antarcticus
 Peninsulapollis gilli
 Phyllocladidites mawsonii
 Podocarpidites sp. cf. P. ellipticus
 Podocarpidites sp. cf. P. herbstii
 Podocarpidites sp.
 Retitriletes austroclavatidites
 Trichotomosulcites subgranulatus
 Tricolpites reticulatus
 Tricolpites sp.
 Trilites fasolae
 Trilites sp. cf. T. tuberculiformis
 Trilites sp. cf. T parvallatus
 Tuberculatosporites parvus
 Vitreisporites signatus

See also 
 List of dinosaur-bearing rock formations

References

Bibliography

Further reading 
 J. E. Powell. 2003. Revision of South American titanosaurid dinosaurs: palaeobiological, palaeobiogeographical and phylogenetic aspects. Records of the Queen Victoria Museum Launceston 111:1-173

Geologic formations of Argentina
Cretaceous Argentina
Maastrichtian Stage of South America
Shale formations
Formations
Fossiliferous stratigraphic units of South America
Paleontology in Argentina
Geography of Santa Cruz Province, Argentina
Geology of Patagonia